Meta Forkel-Liebeskind (22 February 1765 – 1853), was a German writer and translator. She was one of the so-called Universitätsmamsellen, a group of five academically active women during the 18th-and 19th century, daughters of academics at Göttingen University, alongside Philippine Engelhard, Caroline Schelling, Therese Huber, and Dorothea Schlözer.

Sources 
 Eckart Kleßmann: Universitätsmamsellen. Fünf aufgeklärte Frauen zwischen Rokoko, Revolution und Romantik. Die Andere Bibliothek Bd. 281. Eichborn, Frankfurt am Main 2008, 

1765 births
1853 deaths
18th-century German people
18th-century German writers
18th-century German women writers
19th-century German people
19th-century German writers
19th-century German women writers
19th-century German translators